Hyalurga halizoa is a moth of the family Erebidae. It was described by Herbert Druce in 1907. It is found on Jamaica.

References

 

Hyalurga
Moths described in 1907